The giant Philippine frog, large swamp frog, or Mindanao fanged frog (Limnonectes magnus) is a species of frog in the family Dicroglossidae. It is endemic to the Philippines. Its natural habitats are tropical moist lowland forests, subtropical or tropical moist montane forests, rivers, intermittent rivers, freshwater marshes, and intermittent freshwater marshes. It is becoming rare due to habitat loss.

References

Limnonectes
Amphibians of the Philippines
Endemic fauna of the Philippines
Taxonomy articles created by Polbot
Amphibians described in 1910